This is a list of United States Amateur Disc Golf Champions, that is, all the men that have won the United States Amateur Championship of the PDGA (Professional Disc Golf Association). The USADGC is held annually at the famed Toboggan Course at Kensington Metropark, north of Detroit, Michigan, in Milford, Michigan. The winner of the USADGC is given an automatic berth to the United States Disc Golf Championship, held in Rock Hill, South Carolina. The event has been held since 2002 in this format, with the winner frequently being picked up by Discraft, a disc manufacturing company out of Wixom, Michigan. Currently the record for margin of victory in the USADGC is ten strokes, held by David Wiggins Jr and set in 2010, Wiggins Jr also set a new record for total number of strokes under par (20). Todd White was the tournament director for the event from 2002 through 2008, after which he stepped down.

USADGC Champions

Disc golf in the United States
Disc golf tournaments